Okada Station (岡田駅) is the name of two train stations in Japan:

 Okada Station (Ehime)
 Okada Station (Kagawa)